The Eighth Van Cliburn International Piano Competition took place in Fort Worth, Texas, from May 27 to June 11, 1989. Soviet pianist Alexei Sultanov won the competition, while José Carlos Cocarelli and Benedetto Lupo were awarded the Silver and bronze medals.

William Schuman composed his Chester Variations for the competition, while Robert Rauschenberg created its official artwork.

Jurors

  John Giordano (chairman)
  Sergei Dorensky
  Jan Ekier
  Nicole Henriot-Schweitzer
  Lawrence Leighton Smith
  Ming-Qiang Li
  John Lill
  Minoru Nojima
  Cristina Ortiz
  John Pfeiffer
  György Sándor
  Maxim Shostakovich
  Abbey Simon
  Takahiro Sonoda
  Joaquín Soriano
  Ralph Votapek

Results

References

Van Cliburn International Piano Competition